Henry Woods (born 7 September 1999) is an English professional footballer who plays as a midfielder for Maidstone United.

Career
Woods turned professional with Gillingham in January 2018, at the same time as Jack Tucker and Ryan Huckle. He made his debut on 13 November 2018 in the EFL Trophy.

On 5 December 2018, Woods joined Sittingbourne on a one-month loan deal alongside his teammate from Gillingham, Danny Divine. On 10 January 2019, Sittingbourne announced that they had extended both players' loan deals for the rest of the season.

He was offered a new contract by Gillingham at the end of the 2018–19 season. He moved on loan to Concord Rangers in October 2019. The loan ended a month later, but he returned to the club for a second loan spell in December 2019.

Woods was to be released by Gillingham at the end of the 2019–20 season, but then signed a contract on 4 September 2020 to stay at the club for another year. Woods made his league debut for the club on 10 October 2020 as a 90th minute substitute in a  3–1 win over Oxford United.

On 27 July 2021, Woods signed a new contract with the club and joined National League side Dover Athletic on loan until 10 January 2022. In November 2021, Woods scored a first career goal as he equalised for a second time in a match where Dover were defeated 3–2 by Wealdstone. In January 2022, Woods' loan deal was extended until the end of the season.

On 27 June 2022, Woods joined newly promoted National League club Maidstone United on a free transfer.

Career statistics

References

1999 births
Living people
English footballers
Gillingham F.C. players
Sittingbourne F.C. players
Concord Rangers F.C. players
Dover Athletic F.C. players
Maidstone United F.C. players
Association football midfielders
Isthmian League players
National League (English football) players
English Football League players